Mary Constance Charteris, Countess of Wemyss and March (née Wyndham; 3 August 1862 – 29 April 1937), styled Lady Elcho from 1883 to 1914, was an English society hostess and an original member of The Souls, an exclusive social and intellectual club.

Early life and ancestry 
Mary Constance Wyndham was born on 3 August 1862 in London at her parents' home in Belgrave Square. She was the eldest daughter of Percy Wyndham and Madeline Caroline Frances Eden Campbell. Her paternal grandfather was George Wyndham, 1st Baron Leconfield. Her maternal grandfather was Sir Guy Campbell, 1st Baronet.

She was a great-granddaughter of Irish revolutionary Lord Edward FitzGerald, the son of James FitzGerald, 1st Duke of Leinster. Her great-great-grandmother, Emily FitzGerald, Duchess of Leinster, was one of the Lennox sisters and a daughter of Charles Lennox, 2nd Duke of Richmond.

Her brothers were George Wyndham and Guy Wyndham. She had two younger sisters: Madeline, the wife of Charles Adeane, and Pamela, first the wife of Edward Tennant, 1st Baron Glenconner, and later the wife of Edward Grey, 1st Viscount Grey of Fallodon.

Society life
Wyndham and her siblings and their spouses were members of The Souls, an elite English social group. She and her two sisters were the subjects of John Singer Sargent's 1899 painting The Wyndham Sisters: Lady Elcho, Mrs. Adeane, and Mrs. Tennant. Her life was detailed in the book Those Wild Wyndhams by Claudia Renton.

Marriage and issue
Wyndham and Hugo Charteris, Lord Elcho, who would later inherit the titles of 11th Earl of Wemyss and 7th Earl of March, were married on 9 August 1883. They had seven children:
 Hugo Francis Charteris, Lord Elcho (b. 28 Dec 1884, d. 23 Apr 1916), who married Violet Manners.
 Guy Lawrence Charteris (b. 23 May 1886, d. 21 Sep 1967)
 Lady Cynthia Mary Evelyn Charteris (b. 27 Sep 1887, d. 31 Mar 1960)
 Colin Charteris (b. 1 Jun 1889, d. 27 Dec 1892)
 Lady Mary Pamela Madeline Sibell Charteris (b. 24 Oct 1895, d. 1991)
 Yvo Alan Charteris (b. 6 Oct 1896, d. 17 Oct 1915)
 Lady Irene Corona Charteris (b. 31 May 1902, d. 1989)

Wyndham was the paternal grandmother of society hostess Ann Charteris, of Laura Spencer-Churchill, Duchess of Marlborough and novelist Hugo Charteris.

Death 
She died on 29 April 1937.

References

1862 births
1937 deaths
English socialites
Wemyss
People from Belgravia
Mary Constance Wyndham
Mary
Scottish socialites